Latimojong (Indonesian: Gunung Latimojong), also known by its peak name Rantemario, is a mountain located in the province of South Sulawesi, Sulawesi, Indonesia. At , it is the highest mountain on the island, although some sources state Mount Rantekombola as the highest point.

Locally, Rantemario is more commonly referred to as Latimojong. Latimojong is also the name of local mountain range and forest area of which Rantemario is the highest peak.

Rantemario can be climbed from the village of Karangan and has eight designated staging points, some of which are suitable for camping and have access to water. The nearest town is Baraka, 8 km off the main highway between Makassar and Tana Toraja.

See also
 List of islands by highest point
 List of peaks by prominence
 List of Ultras of Malay Archipelago

References

External links
 "Rantemario" on summitpost.org

Rantemario
Landforms of South Sulawesi